was a Japanese professional baseball player. He was a pitcher. In 1954, he was the MVP of the Central League. His career lasted 10 seasons, from 1950 to 1960.

References

1925 births
2013 deaths
Baseball people from Hyōgo Prefecture
Japanese baseball players
Nippon Professional Baseball pitchers
Yomiuri Giants players
Japanese baseball coaches
Nippon Professional Baseball coaches
Deaths from leukemia